

Patrick Long (born July 28, 1981) is a professional racing driver, one of 18 Porsche factory racing drivers, and the only American to hold that distinction.

Racing career

Sports car racing

Following a successful career in karts and the open wheel ladder system, Thousand Oaks-born Long caught the eye of Red Bull, and was included in the inaugural Red Bull Formula 1 Driver Search. During that test, he came to the attention of Porsche, for whom he has driven — first as a Junior driver, then as a Factory driver, since 2003. Patrick has had notable success racing for Porsche, including class wins at all four sportscar "classics" - the 24 Hours of Le Mans (2005, 2007), the Rolex 24 At Daytona (2009), Petit Le Mans (2005, 2006, 2007) and the Mobil One 12 Hours of Sebring (2005). Patrick is a three-time American Le Mans Series driver's champion, winning the GT2/GT class in 2005, 2009 and 2010, and won the Pirelli World Challenge Driver's Championship in 2011 and 2017. Additionally, he was part of the driving trio that claimed the first international competition victory for the innovative Porsche 911 GT3 R Hybrid, in the 2010 1000 km of Zhuhai, China. From 2006 to 2008, Patrick drove for the legendary Penske Racing team in a Porsche RS Spyder, culminating in an LMP2 class victory and second place overall at the 2008 Petit Le Mans. In 2015, Patrick led the Dempsey-Proton team to success in the FIA World Endurance Championship, co-driving with Marco Seefried and Patrick Dempsey, notably scoring a 2nd-place finish at the 24 Hours of Le Mans and helping secure Dempsey's first professional racing victory in the GTE-AM class at Fuji, in Japan.

For 2016, he raced twin programs: again in the FIA WEC in #88 Abu Dhabi-Proton Racing Porsche 911 RSR with Khaled Al-Qubaisi and David Heinemeier Hansson, as well as a full-season attack on the Pirelli World Challenge with Wright Motorsports.

He has made two starts in the Australian V8 Supercar Series — in 2010 for Garry Rogers Motorsport Fujitsu Racing where he finished 4th and 11th in the dual races at the Gold Coast, and in 2011 for Walkinshaw Bundaberg Racing where he finished 5th and 17th in dual races.

NASCAR
Patrick has made starts in various NASCAR racing series, including one start in the Sprint Cup (Watkins Glen, 2012) where he finished 42nd due to brake issues, and one in Nationwide Series (2010, Road America) where he finished 14th after starting 6th leading two laps in a D'Hondt Humphrey Motorsports Toyota. Long also competed 5 races in K&N Pro Series East between 2009 and 2010, 4 races in ovals, where his best finish was 5th at Tri-County Motor Speedway but his most successful start came at road course: on June 6, 2009, Long was leading the K&N Pro Series' race at Watkins Glen on the last lap before being passed in the final turn. He also competed in NASCAR K&N Pro Series West just two weeks later, Long was in second place on the last lap of the K&N Pro Series West race at Infineon Raceway when he made contact with the leader (Joey Logano) who spun out. Although Long took the checkered flag first, he was stripped of the win by NASCAR due to contact and placed at the tail end of the lead lap. After the questionable penalty, Long finished 23rd after having started on the pole. Later that season he took a convincing first victory at Utah Motorsports Campus, in Salt Lake City. In 2010, Long won the NASCAR West event at Portland. He also was leading once again at Utah when a flat tire ended his day with three laps remaining. Long also competed in ovals, like Irwindale Speedway, Iowa Speedway and Phoenix in the West Series, between 2009 and 2010, but he finished 4th, 15th and 18th respectively. Long also attempted the 2012 race of K&N Pro Series West at Utah Motorsports Campus, but due to engine issues, he withdrew. Long also has one ARCA Racing Series start in 2009, where he took pole position and victory after led 46 of 67 laps at NJMP after a race long scrap with Parker Kligerman.

Personal life
His younger brother, Kevin "Spanky" Long, is a professional skateboarder.

Motorsports career results

24 Hours of Le Mans results

Complete FIA World Endurance Championship results

Rolex Sports Car Series results
(key)

American Le Mans Series results
(key)

WeatherTech SportsCar Championship results
(key)

† Points only counted towards the WeatherTech Sprint Cup and not the overall GTD Championship.

Blancpain GT World Challenge America results
(key)

* Season is still in progress.

V8 Supercar results

+ Not Eligible for points

24 Hours Nürburgring results

Bathurst 12 Hour results

NASCAR
(key) (Bold – Pole position awarded by qualifying time. Italics – Pole position earned by points standings or practice time. * – Most laps led.)

Sprint Cup Series

Nationwide Series

K&N Pro Series East

K&N Pro Series West

References

External links
 
 

Living people
1981 births
People from Thousand Oaks, California
Racing drivers from California
24 Hours of Le Mans drivers
24 Hours of Daytona drivers
American Le Mans Series drivers
European Le Mans Series drivers
Rolex Sports Car Series drivers
Porsche Supercup drivers
British Formula Renault 2.0 drivers
Formula Ford drivers
NASCAR drivers
Supercars Championship drivers
FIA World Endurance Championship drivers
WeatherTech SportsCar Championship drivers
24 Hours of Spa drivers
Sportspeople from Ventura County, California
Porsche Carrera Cup GB drivers
Manor Motorsport drivers
Team Penske drivers
GT World Challenge America drivers
Porsche Motorsports drivers
Garry Rogers Motorsport drivers
Walker Racing drivers
Nürburgring 24 Hours drivers
Porsche Carrera Cup Germany drivers